The Continental Lacrosse Conference (CLC) is a conference in the Men's Collegiate Lacrosse Association (MCLA). The CLC incorporates teams in Connecticut, Massachusetts, Michigan, New Hampshire, New York, Pennsylvania, and Rhode Island and is divided into two divisions, Division I and Division II.

History
The conference was formed on August 8, 2018, after the conference commissioners of the Central Collegiate Lacrosse Association and the Pioneer Collegiate Lacrosse League agreed to merge their conferences into one Continental League Conference.

Teams

Division 1

Division 2

Conference Championships 

 Note: Bold text denotes MCLA National Champion
 Note: Italic text denotes MCLA National Champion runner-up

References

External links
 

2019 establishments in the United States
College lacrosse leagues in the United States
Sports leagues established in 2019